Benjamin David Fleming Beith (1884–1960) was a British businessman in China and member of the Executive Council and Legislative Council of Hong Kong.

B. D. F. Beith was the manager of the Jardine Matheson & Co. and worked in both Hong Kong and Shanghai. He was also member of the board of the Hongkong and Shanghai Banking Corporation in 1925.

He was made Justice of the Peace in January 1928. In the same year, he was appointed to the Legislative Council in May. In April 1929, he was nominated by the Chamber of Commerce to fill the vacancy at the Legislative Council for eight months during the absence of John Owen Hughes. He was again appointed to the Legislative Council in March 1930 in replacement of A. C. Hynes and continued to serve until 1933.

He became member of the Executive Council in June 1929 during the absence of Henry Pollock.

Among others he was also member of the Authorized Architects' Committee.

References

1884 births
1960 deaths
HSBC people
Jardine Matheson Group
Hong Kong businesspeople
20th-century British businesspeople
British expatriates in Hong Kong
British expatriates in China
Members of the Legislative Council of Hong Kong
Members of the Executive Council of Hong Kong